A PV mount is a lens mount developed by Panavision for use with both 16 mm and 35 mm film and digital movie cameras of various sensor sizes. It is one of the mounts offered with Panavision cameras and Panavision-designed lenses. Panavision also modifies ("Panavises") its third party camera and lens equipment in the interest of allowing clients to retain their personal preferences regarding equipment. As they are the only company who can offer this, customers wanting to use Panavision lenses on non-Panavision cameras or vice versa must rent this equipment directly through Panavision.

The mount itself contains four pronged flanges, one of which contains a locating pin in the center. This pin is normally seated at the bottom of the camera lens mount, the usual location where a complementary hole exists.  The mount is locked into place using a friction locking ring which, in conjunction with the four prongs of the flange, creates a very strong lens seating. This has become a crucial factor in recent years, as bigger lenses with zoom capabilities, longer focal lengths, or larger lens elements have raised the bar on requirements for mount stability.

Technical specifications
Flange focal distance: 57.15 mm
Diameter: 49.50 mm
Cameras: 
35 mm all Panavision models and several Arri, RED, Sony and Moviecam models (as available)
16 mm Panavision "Elaine" and several Arri and Aaton models (as available)

Lens mounts
Panavision